The Faroe Islands competed at the 1996 Summer Paralympics in Atlanta, United States. The islands' delegation consisted in a single representative, Ester Høj in swimming (S7 disability category). Høj did not win any medals.

See also 
Faroe Islands at the Paralympics

References

Nations at the 1996 Summer Paralympics
1996
Paralympics